The Gold Medal of the Institute of Mathematics and its Applications (IMA) is a biennial prize established in 1982 by the IMA "in recognition of outstanding contributions to mathematics and its applications over a period of years". These contributions may take several different forms, including "the building up of a research group of exceptional merit", "notable contributions to the application of mathematical techniques" or "outstanding contributions to the improvement of the teaching of mathematics".

Prize winners list
Source: Institute of Mathematics and its Applications
 1982 Professor Sir J. Lighthill, FRS and Dr A. B. Tayler
 1984 Dr J. M. Hammersley, FRS and Sir A. Wilson, FRS
 1986 Professor G. A. Barnard and Professor Sir S. Edwards, FRS
 1988 Professor Sir H. Bondi, FRS
 1990 No award
 1992 Professor O. C. Zienkiewicz, FRS
 1994 Professor F. Ursell, FRS
 1996 Professor M. J. D. Powell, FRS
 1998 No award
 2000 Professor I. N. Stewart, FRS
 2002 Professor K. W. Morton and Professor F. C. Piper
 2004 Professor J. M. T. Thompson, FRS
 2006 Dr J. R. Ockendon
 2008 Professor J. D. Murray, FRS and Professor T. J. Pedley, FRS
 2010 Professor L. N. Trefethen, FRS
 2012 Dr M. Sabin
 2014 C. Cocks CB DSc
 2016 Professor A. C. Croft and Professor D. A. Lawson
 2018 Professor R. Twarock
 2020 Professor N. Higham

See also

 List of mathematics awards

References

Mathematics awards
Awards established in 1982
British science and technology awards